LICSG is now the reserve element of a regular Royal Signals unit 15th Signal Regiment (Information Support) and as of 1 May 2014 became 254 Signal Squadron.

The Land Information and Communications Services Group (LICSG) of the British Army was one of the four Territorial Army (TA) units which constituted Central Volunteer Headquarters Royal Signals (CVHQ), the others being 81 Signal Squadron (Volunteers), the Land Information Assurance Group (LIAG) and the Full Time Reserve Service.  Members of CVHQ are considered to be subject matter experts (SMEs) with current commercial and military skills and experience in either information assurance (IA) or information and communications services (ICS). It is a Royal Signals cap-badged unit and has members who have served with the Royal Navy; Army units: Royal Artillery, Royal Engineers, Royal Signals, Royal Electrical & Mechanical Engineers, Infantry units and the Royal Logistics Corps together with the Royal Air Force.

The LICSG provided critical national infrastructure (CNI) support in line with both the National Cyber Security Strategy and ISO/IEC 27001 (a compliance standard for information security management), offering specialist expertise and advice at every stage of the development and management of ICS.  Key functions which it can undertake include:

 Strategic, operational and requirements analysis
 Planning
 Solution design
 Programme and project implementation
 In-service support and advice
 Business continuity planning
 Service management (ITIL)
 Continuous improvement analysis

The LICSG helped bring about the following effects for a defence organization:

Deployed HQs and staffs
Campaign Signal regiments
Permanent joint operating bases (PJOBs) overseas
UK homeland MoD organisations
The MoD Information Systems and Services (ISS) directorate
The MoD Global Operational Security Control Centre (GOSCC)
Defence lines of development (DLODs)
Friendly nations

External links
 Land Information and Communications Services Group (V) (LICSG) - on British Army official website

Military communications of the United Kingdom
Regiments of the Royal Corps of Signals
Army Reserve (United Kingdom)